The Iron Guppy is a tugboat, built in 2016, and owned and operated by Ports Toronto.
She replaced the William Rest, a tugboat that served in Ports Toronto, and its predecessor agencies, since 1961.  The Iron Guppy has very similar operational characteristics as the William Rest, however, with modern electronics.

Ports Toronto called upon elementary school students to help pick the vessel's name.

The vessel was designed by Robert Allan Limited, ship architects, and built by Hike Metals of Wheatley, Ontario.

Fireboat William Lyon MacKenzie gave the Iron Guppy a ceremonial shower, to mark her commissioning, on July 23, 2016.

References

External links

2016 ships
Tugboats of Canada
Tugboats on the Great Lakes
Ships built in Ontario